Nipparts is a private company set up in 1981 and based in the Netherlands and supplies Japanese and Korean aftermarket car parts in Europe.

History
Nipparts was established in 1981. From 2005, Nipparts had been a member of Sator Holding.
 
Nipparts is an automotive parts seller, that specialises in Japanese and Korean parts. It is based in the Netherlands but is also present in over 35 countries.

As specialists in Japanese and Korean parts, Nipparts supplies parts for over 35 car manufactures such as Nissan, Toyota and Kia. Parts include air filters, clutches and fan belts.

Origins of Name
The Nipparts name derives from the word Nippon, a native name for Japan.

Divisions

Nipparts is active in the entire European market. In the Benelux Nipparts is sold in through Van Heck.

Nipparts B.V.

It is based in Amsterdam.

External links
Nipparts Official Website
Sator Holding Official Website

Auto parts suppliers of the Netherlands
Automotive part retailers